Domenico Rivarola (1575–1627) was a Roman Catholic cardinal.

Biography
On 28 Dec 1608, he was consecrated bishop by Michelangelo Tonti, Cardinal-Priest of San Bartolomeo all'Isola, with Metello Bichi, Bishop Emeritus of Sovana, and Valeriano Muti, Bishop of Città di Castello, serving as co-consecrators.

Episcopal succession
While bishop, he was the principal consecrator of:

and the principal co-consecrator of:

References

Anthony van Dyck (1599-1641) painted a portrait of Cardinal Rivarola in 1623–1624. It currently belongs to the Portland Art Museum, Portland, Oregon. A 1624 copy of this painting, also by van Dyck, is in the collection of Salsbury House and Garden, Des Moines, Iowa.

1575 births
1627 deaths
17th-century Italian Roman Catholic bishops
Bishops of Aléria
Clergy from Genoa